The Observatory is a publication, variously described as a journal, a magazine and a review, devoted to astronomy. It appeared regularly starting in 1877, and it is now published every two months. The current editors are David Stickland, Bob Argyle and Steve Fossey.

Although it is not published by the Royal Astronomical Society, it publishes the reports of its meetings. Other features are the extensive book reviews and "Here and There", a collection of misprints and ridiculous statements of astronomical interest.

The founder and first editor (1877–1882) was William Christie, then chief assistant at the Royal Observatory and later Astronomer Royal. Notable subsequent editors include:

 Arthur Eddington (1913–1919)
 Harold Spencer Jones (1915–1923)
 Richard van der Riet Woolley (1933–1939)
 William McCrea (1935–1937)
 Margaret Burbidge (1948–1951)
 Antony Hewish (1957–1961)
 Donald Lynden-Bell (1967–1969)
 Carole Jordan (1968–1973)
 Jocelyn Bell Burnell (1973–1976)

References

Further reading

External links
 Official web site

Science and technology magazines published in the United Kingdom
Astronomy journals
Magazines established in 1877
1877 establishments in the United Kingdom
Royal Astronomical Society
Astronomy magazines
Bi-monthly magazines published in the United Kingdom